This is a list of the pupils of the 19th-century French painter Gustave Boulanger.

 Marie Bashkirtseff 
 Jules Benoit-Lévy
 Maurice Bompard
 
 Louis-Robert Carrier-Belleuse
 Maurice Chabas
 Louis Chalon
 Charles Cottet
 Walter Lofthouse Dean
 
 Thomas Dewing
 Henri Lucien Doucet
 Arthur Wesley Dow
 
 
 
 Maximilienne Guyon
 Osman Hamdi Bey
 Childe Hassam
 Louis Welden Hawkins
 George Hitchcock
 Paul Jamin 
 Alice De Wolf Kellogg
 
 Ernst Friedrich von Liphart
 Gari Melchers
 Willard Metcalf
 Thomas Corsan Morton
 Alphonse Mucha
 Théophile Poilpot
 
 Léon Richet
 Alexander Ignatius Roche,
 Georges Rochegrosse
 
 Earl Shinn
 
 Elmer Boyd Smith
 Edmund C. Tarbell
 Francis Tattegrain
 
 Louis Valtat
 Harry Watrous
 Albert Beck Wenzell

References

Boulanger